Frank Murray may refer to:

Frank Murray (coach) (1885–1951), American football and basketball coach
Frank H. Murray (born 1953), American business executive
Frank Jerome Murray (1904–1995), American judge
Frank J. Murray (priest) (born 1949), American priest and politician

See also
Frank Murrey (fl. 1910s–1920s), American football player and track athlete